Hellinsia unicolor is a moth of the family Pterophoridae described by William Barnes and James Halliday McDunnough in 1913. It is found in North America, including Florida, Mississippi, Georgia and Kentucky.

The wingspan is about 14–20 mm. The forewings are a pale straw color, slightly tinged with smoky along the terminal margins of the lobes. The hindwings are pale smoky with lighter silky fringes.

The larvae feed on Eupatorium capillifolium. They bore in the stem and roots of their host plant.

References

Moths described in 1913
unicolor
Moths of North America
Fauna of the Southeastern United States
Taxa named by William Barnes (entomologist)
Taxa named by James Halliday McDunnough